
Muhammad Asif (born 8 May 1986) is a Pakistani baseball pitcher.

Career

2010
Asif was part of the Pakistan national team at the 2010 Asian Games in Guangzhou, China.

2017
Asif also played for Pakistan in the qualifying round of the 2017 World Baseball Classic.

References 

1986 births
Living people
Baseball players at the 2010 Asian Games
Pakistani baseball players
Asian Games competitors for Pakistan